The  are seven  that formed a Cimbrian enclave in the Veneto region of north-east Italy. Cimbrian, a dialect of Upper German, was the native tongue, and the area was ethnically and culturally distinct from the surrounding comuni. The Sette Comuni are located in mountainous territory, ranging from 500 to 2300 metres above sea level.

Comuni

History 

The seven comuni formed into a loose commonwealth in 1310. They were historically under the suzerainty of the Milanese House of Visconti and then under the Republic of Venice. Under both they enjoyed wide cultural and political autonomy in exchange for their loyalty. This autonomous status came to an end with the Napoleonic Wars and the demise of the Serenìsima in 1807.

World War I 

During the First World War the territory was located along the border between the Kingdom of Italy and the Austro-Hungarian Empire. Many battles took place here between 1915 and 1918 (the most important one was the battle of Asiago). Almost all the towns were completely destroyed by the war.

Cimbrian 

Cimbrian has gone extinct in most of the comuni.

Vestiges of the language are found in family and place names, which are mostly still Cimbrian.

See also
 Calà del Sasso
 Thirteen Communities

References

External links 
 Asiago Turismo

Province of Vicenza